was a Japanese member of the Imperial House of Japan and the third son of Takahito, Prince Mikasa and Yuriko, Princess Mikasa. He was a first cousin of Emperor Akihito, and was seventh in line to the Chrysanthemum Throne at the time of his death.

Education
The Prince was born in Prince Mikasa's family home at Tokyo, He was
graduated from the Department of Law of Gakushuin University in 1978. He studied abroad from 1978 to 1981 at Queen's University Faculty of Law in Kingston, Ontario, Canada. After his return to Japan, he served as administrator of the Japan Foundation from 1981 to 2002.

Marriage and family
The Prince became engaged to Hisako Tottori, eldest daughter of Shigejirō Tottori, on 17 September 1984, whom he had met at a reception held by the Canadian Embassy in Tokyo. They married on 6 December 1984. He was born as Prince Norihito of Mikasa, and received the title Prince Takamado (Takamado-no-miya) and authorization to start a new branch of the Imperial Family on 1 December 1984 in celebration of his wedding. The couple had three daughters:

Public service
Prince Takamado was honorary president of various charitable organizations involved with sponsorship of international exchange especially involving music, dance, and sports. He was often dubbed  in Japan. He supported a number of foreign language speech contests. He was also very much involved in environmental issues and environmental education. The Prince was an honorary member of AV Edo-Rhenania zu Tokio, a Roman Catholic student fraternity that is affiliated with the Cartellverband.

Prince and Princess Takamado were the most widely traveled couple in the Japanese imperial family, visiting 35 countries together in 15 years to represent Japan on various functions. The Prince's last visits included Egypt and Morocco in May 2000, Hawaii in July 2001 (to promote the Japanese tea ceremony), and to the Republic of Korea from May to June 2002. The latter was in order to attend the opening ceremony of the 2002 FIFA World Cup in South Korea and Japan. The goodwill visit by the Prince and Princess to Korea was the first Japanese imperial visit since World War II, and was an important step in the promotion of friendly bilateral relations between Japan and Korea. While in Korea, the couple toured the country extensively, met with President Kim Dae-jung and ordinary Koreans, and he visited the facilities for the physically disabled in South Korea that the Princess Nashimoto Masako had sponsored.

Death
On 21 November 2002, while having a squash lesson together with the Canadian ambassador Robert G. Wright at the Canadian Embassy in Tokyo, the Prince collapsed from ventricular fibrillation and was rushed to Keio University Hospital, where he went into cardiac arrest and died at the age of 47.

The sudden death of one of the youngest and most active members of the Japanese Imperial Family shocked the nation. The Prince's funeral was held at Toshimagaoka Imperial Cemetery in northern Tokyo with around 900 people in attendance including members of the Imperial Family and politicians from Japan and other countries.

The Prince Takamado Cup, Japan's national youth football cup tournament, is named after him. The Japanese artwork and artifacts collection of the Royal Ontario Museum in Toronto is named the Prince Takamado Gallery of Japan in honour of his close connection with Canada.

Titles, styles and honours

 29 December 1954 – 1 December 1984: His Imperial Highness Prince Norihito of Mikasa
 1 December 1984 – 21 November 2002: His Imperial Highness Prince Takamado

National honours
 Grand Cordon of the Order of the Chrysanthemum (29 December 1974)

Foreign honours
 : Recipient of the Nersornaat Medal for Meritorious Service, 1st Class
 : Knight Grand Cross of the Order of Merit of the Italian Republic (9 March 1982)

Honorary positions
 Honorary President of the Japan Football Association
 Honorary President of Japan Association of fencing
 Honorary President of Japan Squash Association
 Honorary President of Federation of All Japan Baseball
 Honorary President of the Japan Student Association Foundation
 Honorary President of Japan Society rescue poorly
 President of Federation of Japan Amateur Orchestras

Issue

Ancestry

Patrilineal descent

Imperial House of Japan

 Descent prior to Keitai is unclear to modern historians, but traditionally traced back patrilineally to Emperor Jimmu
 Emperor Keitai, ca. 450–534
 Emperor Kinmei, 509–571
 Emperor Bidatsu, 538–585
 Prince Oshisaka, ca. 556–???
 Emperor Jomei, 593–641
 Emperor Tenji, 626–671
 Prince Shiki, ???–716
 Emperor Kōnin, 709–786
 Emperor Kanmu, 737–806
 Emperor Saga, 786–842
 Emperor Ninmyō, 810–850
 Emperor Kōkō, 830–867
 Emperor Uda, 867–931
 Emperor Daigo, 885–930
 Emperor Murakami, 926–967
 Emperor En'yū, 959–991
 Emperor Ichijō, 980–1011
 Emperor Go-Suzaku, 1009–1045
 Emperor Go-Sanjō, 1034–1073
 Emperor Shirakawa, 1053–1129
 Emperor Horikawa, 1079–1107
 Emperor Toba, 1103–1156
 Emperor Go-Shirakawa, 1127–1192
 Emperor Takakura, 1161–1181
 Emperor Go-Toba, 1180–1239
 Emperor Tsuchimikado, 1196–1231
 Emperor Go-Saga, 1220–1272
 Emperor Go-Fukakusa, 1243–1304
 Emperor Fushimi, 1265–1317
 Emperor Go-Fushimi, 1288–1336
 Emperor Kōgon, 1313–1364
 Emperor Sukō, 1334–1398
 Prince Yoshihito Fushimi, 1351–1416
 Prince Sadafusa Fushimi, 1372–1456
 Emperor Go-Hanazono, 1419–1471
 Emperor Go-Tsuchimikado, 1442–1500
 Emperor Go-Kashiwabara, 1464–1526
 Emperor Go-Nara, 1495–1557
 Emperor Ōgimachi, 1517–1593
 Prince Masahito, 1552–1586
 Emperor Go-Yōzei, 1572–1617
 Emperor Go-Mizunoo, 1596–1680
 Emperor Reigen, 1654–1732
 Emperor Higashiyama, 1675–1710
 Prince Naohito Kanin, 1704–1753
 Prince Sukehito Kanin, 1733–1794
 Emperor Kōkaku, 1771–1840
 Emperor Ninkō, 1800–1846
 Emperor Kōmei, 1831–1867
 Emperor Meiji, 1852–1912
 Emperor Taishō, 1879–1926
 Takahito, Prince Mikasa
 Norihito, Prince Takamado

References

External links

Her Imperial Highness Princess Takamado and her family at the Imperial Household Agency website
The Japan Foundation |The H.I.H. Prince Takamado Memorial Collection
Royal Ontario Museum |Prince Takamado Gallery of Japan

1954 births
2002 deaths
Japanese princes
Takamado, Imperial Prince of Japan
Gakushuin University alumni
People from Tokyo

Knights Grand Cross of the Order of Merit of the Italian Republic
Recipients of Nersornaat